In the run up to the 2019 Spanish local elections, various organisations carried out opinion polling to gauge voting intention in local entities in Spain. Results of such polls for municipalities and the three foral deputations (Juntas Generales) in the Basque Country are displayed in this article. The date range for these opinion polls is from the previous local elections, held on 24 May 2015, to the day the next elections were held, on 26 May 2019.

Polls are listed in reverse chronological order, showing the most recent first and using the dates when the survey fieldwork was done, as opposed to the date of publication. Where the fieldwork dates are unknown, the date of publication is given instead. The highest percentage figure in each polling survey is displayed with its background shaded in the leading party's colour. If a tie ensues, this is applied to the figures with the highest percentages. The "Lead" columns on the right shows the percentage-point difference between the parties with the highest percentages in a given poll.

Municipalities

Barakaldo

Bilbao

Donostia-San Sebastián

Durango

Eibar

Getxo

Irun

Vitoria-Gasteiz

Juntas Generales

Álava

Biscay

Gipuzkoa

Notes

References

Basque Country
2019